
Gmina Łagiewniki is a rural gmina (administrative district) in Dzierżoniów County, Lower Silesian Voivodeship, in south-western Poland.

Neighbouring gminas
Gmina Łagiewniki is bordered by the gminas of Dzierżoniów, Jordanów Śląski, Kondratowice, Marcinowice, Niemcza and Sobótka.

Villages
The gmina contains the villages of Domaszów, Janczowice, Jaźwina, Kuchary, Łagiewniki, Ligota Wielka, Młynica, Mniowice, Oleszna, Przystronie, Radzików, Ratajno, Sieniawka, Sienice, Słupice, Sokolniki, Stoszów, Trzebnik and Uliczno.

References

Lagiewniki
Dzierżoniów County